The District Courts in Albania are the Courts of First Instance, providing the first level of justice in the Judicial system of Albania.

Courts 
At present there are 23 District Courts throughout Albania, which are composed of 251 Judges. These Courts are as follows:

District Court of Berat
District Court of Dibër
District Court of Durrës
District Court of Elbasan
District Court of Fier
District Court of Gjirokastër
District Court of Kavajë
District Court of Korçë
District Court of Krujë
District Court of Kukës
District Court of Kurbin
District Court of Lezhë
District Court of Lushnjë
District Court of Mat
District Court of Përmet
District Court of Pogradec
District Court of Pukë
District Court of Sarandë
District Court of Shkodër
District Court of Tiranë
District Court of Tropojë
District Court of Vlorë

In conjunction with the 22 District Courts that have jurisdiction over their appointed region, there is a Court of First Instance with nationwide jurisdiction in Albania:

 Court of First Instance for Serious Crimes.

References 

Politics of Albania
Courts in Albania